Sathuvachari Varadarajan Mudaliar (9 October 1926 – 2 January 1988), also known as Vardhabhai and Vardha, was an Indian crime boss.  From the early 1960s to the 1980s, he was, along with Karim Lala and Haji Mastan, one of the most powerful mob bosses in Bombay. His origin is Sathuvachari in  North Arcot district of Tamil Nadu, from where his father migrated to Tuticorin to work in shipping business. He was born in Tuticorin, Tamil Nadu.

History 

Varadarajan was born in Tuticorin, Tamilnadu in 1926 He moved to  Mumbai in 1945. Working as a porter at VT Station, he began his criminal life by stealing dock cargo. Varada, as he was fondly called, was hugely popular among the poor Tamil residents in the Dharavi slums. He used the massive Dharavi slums as a safe haven to expand his criminal activities into an underworld empire of extortion, kidnapping, contract killing, land encroachment, illegal gambling and liquor dens, manufacturing illicit liquor and bootlegging. Varada had total control over the distribution racket of illicit liquor.

In the early 1980s, after Haji Mastan gave up his smuggling operations and Karim Lala's Pathan gang was weakened by a split between Samad Khan and Dawood Ibrahim, Varadarajan emerged as a powerful contender in the Mumbai underworld. Varadarajan ran a parallel judicial system within the Tamil community in his strongholds. Starting the 1980s, police officer Y.C. Pawar targeted Varadarajan Mudaliar. Most of his gang members were eliminated or imprisoned. His illegal gambling and liquor dens were closed down and finally by the end of 1983, Varadarajan was forced to abandon his underworld empire and flee from Mumbai to Tamil Nadu.

Personal life 

While a porter at VT Station, Varadarajan began offering food to the poor at the nearby dargah of Bismillah Shah Baba and kept the tradition up as his fortunes rose.

His opulent pandals at Matunga station during the annual Ganesh Chaturthi celebrations were quite famous and visited by celebrities. However, after the collapse of the cotton mills in Mumbai in the mid-1980s, their relevance ended.

During the period of Varadarajan's fading influence, his hugely popular Ganapathi pandal was served an eviction notice at the behest of the police in the mid-1980s. This was also the time when most members of his gang were jailed or eliminated, forcing him to flee Bombay for Madras, where he led a retired life until his demise in January 1988, following a heart attack. Haji Mastan brought his body to Mumbai in a chartered Indian Airlines plane for last rites as per Varda's wishes . Many people mourned his death. Life came to a standstill in Dharavi, Matunga and Sion Koliwada when his body was flown into the city. Varadarajan's dear friend, Selva, was with him throughout his adult life, until his death.

A daughter, Mahalakshmi, died of suffocation in a fire at her home at age 50, along with her husband, Hemachander, in 2010 at Pattinapakkam, Chennai.

In popular culture 

In 1983, in the film Ardh Satya, the character of Rama Shetty played by actor Sadashiv Amrapurkar was loosely based on Varadarajan.

In 1984, actor Amrish Puri played a character called Varadarajan of Dogharbhatti in the movie, Mashaal.

In 1987, Mani Ratnam made his film Nayakan, loosely based on Varadarajan's life. Actor Kamal Haasan played the lead role.

The 1988 Hindi movie Dayavan, starring Vinod Khanna was a remake of Nayakan.

One of the characters in the 1991 Malayalam film Abhimanyu, which was based on the Mumbai underworld activities, holds resemblance to Muthaliar with the character's name being the same.

In a television interview, Amitabh Bachchan stated that he modeled his dialogues and mannerisms in the movie Agneepath after Varadarajan's.

In 2007, In the film Thottal Poo Malarum, Rajkiran Played the role in the name of  Varadarajan Vaandaiyar.

In 2010 Hindi movie Once Upon a Time in Mumbaai the character of Vardhan played by Ravi Khanvilkar was inspired by Varadarajan Mudaliar.

In the 2013 Tamil movie Thalaiva, Sathyaraj's character is mainly extracted from Varadarajan's life. Vijay played the lead and as Sathyaraj's son.

In the 2015 Tamil movie Yagavarayinum Naa Kaakka, starring Mithun Chakraborty a character is mainly extracted from Varadarajan's life.

In the 2018 Tamil movie "Kaala", where the lead role played by Rajinikanth was inspired by Varadarajan's life.

Citations

References

See also 
Organised crime in India

1926 births
1988 deaths
Bootleggers
People from Thoothukudi
Indian gangsters
Indian extortionists
Indian drug traffickers
Indian crime bosses
Indian money launderers
Indian smugglers
Criminals from Mumbai